Volleyball events were contested at the 2003 Summer Universiade in Daegu, South Korea.

References
 Universiade volleyball medalists on HickokSports

Universiade
2003 Summer Universiade
2003